Draken may refer to:

 Saab 35 Draken, a Swedish-manufactured fighter aircraft
 Draken International, a company providing fighter aircraft for training purposes
 The Draken, a fictional monster in the animated series Jumanji
 Draken, a former cinema and concert hall in Stockholm, Sweden.
 Draken Harald Harfagre, a replica Viking longship

See also
 Dragon (disambiguation), alternate name
 Drake (disambiguation)
 Drakan, video game series